Salomè is an album by Italian singer Mina, issued in 1981. Like other works of Mina this is a double album issued as "Vol. 1" and "Vol . 2 ".

The Album

The track Espérame en el Cielo was used by Pedro Almodóvar in the film Matador in 1986. The track titled No is a cover of an Italian song by Armando Manzanero. Mina has also recorded the tracks Una canzone and Quando l'amore ti tocca in French under the titles Une chanson  and Quand l'amour, respectively.

Track listing

Vol. 1

Vol. 2

References

1980 albums
Mina (Italian singer) albums